From Hollywood to Rose is an American comedy-drama film released on 16 June 2017 and directed by Liz Graham and Matt Jacobs, starring Eve Annenberg, Maxx Maulion and Brad Herman.

Cast
 Eve Annenberg as Woman in Wedding Dress
 Maxx Maulion as Man in Cargo Paints
 Brad Herman as Guy in X-men Shirt
 Dave Wilder as Stanley
 Isadora O’Boto as Woman in the Pink Dress
 Chia Chien as Chinese Girl
 Linda Bisesti as The Lady with the Green Scarf
 Eric Deskin as Lizard Guy
 Danny Cleary as Meltdown Bus Driver

Reception
Norman Gidney of Film Threat rated the film 3 stars out of 4 and wrote that the "respect it has for everyone’s story" makes the film "work". Simi Horwitz of Film Journal International wrote that while the film has "self-conscious quirkiness" and "wink-wink moments", it has "unexpected charm, appeal, even depth". The Hollywood Reporter wrote that the film "has a hard time getting beyond its ostentatious quirks and getting to the point; for some viewers who catch what will likely be a very short run, though, that aimlessness will be its main virtue."

Chelsea Phillips-Carr of PopMatters gave the film a rating of 4/10, praising Annenberg's performance while calling the film "clunky" and "unenjoyable". Katie Walsh of the Los Angeles Times wrote that the story is "thin and clichéd, relying on tired gags and stereotypes for humor."

References

External links
 
 

American comedy-drama films
2017 comedy-drama films